Slauson may refer to:

People
 Matt Slauson (born 1986), an American football guard for the Chicago Bears
 J. S. Slauson (1829–1905), a land developer in 19th century Southern California

Metro stations
 Slauson station (A Line), an at-grade light rail station in Los Angeles
 Slauson station (J Line), a freeway median bus station in Los Angeles

Roads
Slauson Avenue, a major east-west thoroughfare for southern Los Angeles County, California
Slauson Freeway, a portion of California State Route 90

Schools
Slauson Middle School (disambiguation)
An intermediate school in the Azusa Unified School District
Slauson Middle School (Ann Arbor, Michigan)